Australian wormy chestnut or firestreak is a common name for lumber of Eucalyptus obliqua, Eucalyptus sieberi and Eucalyptus fastigata grown in Victoria, southern New South Wales, and Tasmania in Australia.  It is a hardwood species commonly used in flooring applications.

References

Trees of Australia
Eucalyptus
Wood
Plant common names